Colonel Anderson may refer to:
Charles DeWitt Anderson (1827–1901), Confederate colonel
William Herbert Anderson (1881–1918), Lieutenant-Colonel
Maurice Anderson (1908–1986), Lieutenant-Colonel